Lily Brown (born March 20, 1981, in Boston, Massachusetts) is an American poet.

Brown is author of the poetry collection Rust or Go Missing (Cleveland State University Poetry Center, 2011). Her poetry has appeared in journals such as American Letters and Commentary, Colorado Review, Denver Quarterly, Fence, Gulf Coast, Pleiades, and Tarpaulin Sky.  She currently teaches English at the Nueva Upper School in San Mateo, CA. 

Brown holds an A.B. in women's studies from Harvard College and an M.F.A. in creative writing from Saint Mary's College of California.

References

External links
Lily Brown on PBS Newshour
Brown interviewed by Author Compare
Brown’s author page on The Cleveland State University Poetry Center website

1981 births
21st-century American poets
American women poets
Harvard College alumni
Living people
Writers from Boston
Saint Mary's College of California alumni
21st-century American women writers